16:10 (1.6) is an aspect ratio commonly used for computer displays and tablet computers. It is equal to 8/5, close to the golden ratio, which is approximately 1.618.

History 
LCD computer displays with a 16:10 ratio first rose to mass market prominence in 2003. By 2008, the 16:10 aspect ratio had become the most common aspect ratio for LCD monitors and laptop displays. After 2010, however, 16:9 became the mainstream standard. This shift was driven by lower manufacturing costs and the 16:9 aspect ratio being used as a standard in modern televisions.

Rise in popularity from 2003 
Until about 2003, most computer monitors had a 4:3 aspect ratio, with some using a 5:4 ratio. Between 2003 and 2006, monitors with 16:10 aspect ratios became commonly available, first in laptops, and later in display monitors. Such displays were considered better suited for word processing and computer-aided design.

From 2005 to 2008, 16:10 overtook 4:3 as the highest-selling aspect ratio for LCD monitors. At the time, 16:10 made up 90% of the notebook market, and was the most commonly used aspect ratio for laptops. However, 16:10 had a short reign as the most common aspect ratio.

Decline from 2008 
Around 2008–2010, computer display manufacturers began a rapid shift to the 16:9 aspect ratio. By 2011, 16:10 had almost disappeared from new mass-market products. By October 2012, the market share of 16:10 displays had dropped to less than 23%, according to Net Applications.

The primary reason for this move was considered to be production efficiency: Since display panels for TVs use the 16:9 aspect ratio, it became more efficient for display manufacturers to produce computer display panels in the same aspect ratio. A 2008 report by DisplaySearch also cited several other reasons, including the ability for PC and monitor manufacturers to expand their product ranges by offering products with wider screens and higher resolutions. This helped consumers adopt such products more easily, "stimulating the growth of the notebook PC and LCD monitor market".

The shift from 16:10 to 16:9 was met with a mixed response. The lower cost of 16:9 computer displays was seen as a positive, along with their suitability for gaming and movies, as well as the convenience of having the same aspect ratio in different devices. On the other hand, there was criticism towards the lack of vertical screen real estate when compared to 16:10 displays of the same screen diagonal. For this reason, some considered 16:9 displays less suitable for productivity-oriented tasks, such as editing documents or spreadsheets and using design or engineering applications, which are mostly designed for taller, rather than wider screens.

Several companies still offer 16:10 aspect ratio monitors as of March 2021. These monitors are intended for photographers, video editors, digital artists, desktop publishers, graphic designers, and business customers.

Resurgence 
In 2020, Dell released high-end productivity laptops with the 16:10 aspect ratio, and Microsoft launched a new version of its 3:2 Surface Book. The version of the Dell XPS produced around this time was the first that moved away from the classic 16:9 aspect ratio. Other examples include the Acer Swift 3, LG Gram, and Asus ProArt Studiobook. In 2021, the Steam Deck, a handheld gaming computer produced by Valve, was announced, featuring a 16:10 display. More gaming laptops have also been increasingly made available with 16:10 screens. Apple used 16:10 aspect ratios in its MacBook lineup of laptops until late 2021, when they were changed to a slightly taller 1.55:1 (16:10.3) ratio.

Tablets 
Tablets started to enjoy mainstream popularity beginning late 2010/early 2011 and remain popular to the present day. Aspect ratios for tablets typically include 16:10, 16:9, and 4:3. Tablets have caused a shift in production away from purely 16:9 aspect ratios and a resurgence of "productivity" aspect ratios (including 16:10 and 4:3) in place of "media" aspect ratios (16:9 and ultra-widescreen formats). The format remains widely popular in the TV and smartphone industries, where it is more suited.

Many Android tablets have a 16:10 aspect ratio, because the 16:10 aspect ratio is suitable for reading books, and many papers have an aspect ratio close to 16:10 (e.g., ISO 216 papers use the 1:1.414 aspect ratio). Apple's iPad uses a 4:3 aspect ratio for similar reasons. Both formats come significantly closer to emulating the aspect ratio of A4 paper than 16:9.

Common resolutions 
This is a list of common resolutions with the 16:10 aspect ratio:

See also 
 Display aspect ratio
 Aspect ratio (image)
 Computer display standard

References 

Picture aspect ratios